Jeffrey Sauer (March 10, 1943 – February 2, 2017) was an American ice hockey player and coach. Sauer was the head coach at the University of Wisconsin from 1982 to 2002 and Colorado College from 1971 to 1982.  While at Wisconsin, he led the Badgers to two NCAA men's ice hockey championships.  He was the special assistant to the commissioner of the WCHA prior to his death.

Career

Playing
Jeff Sauer accepted an athletic scholarship from Colorado College and began attending the school in 1961. After sitting out the Tigers' disastrous 0-23 season in 1961-62 Sauer became part of the rebuild under first Tony Frasca and then Bob Johnson. Despite his efforts, Sauer couldn't help Colorado College reach the WCHA playoffs in any of his three seasons before graduating in 1965.

Coaching
After graduating Sauer signed on as an assistant under Johnson at CC and then followed his former coach to Wisconsin, staying with the program until just after the Badgers joined the WCHA before he received his shot behind the bench at his alma mater. Sauer took over for a rather moribund program that had seen only two winning seasons in their past 13 campaigns and slowly brought the team back to respectability. It took Sauer 4 years to build a winning team, finishing 1974-75 3rd place in the conference, but his biggest achievement came three years later when the 5th-place Tigers upset a 33-win Denver team to capture a share of the WCHA tournament, the only conference tournament title in team history. (as of 2014) All told, however, Sauer didn't have much more success than his predecessors as he could only provide Colorado College with 2 winning seasons in 11 years as head coach.

When his former boss Johnson left Wisconsin after 1981–82 to pursue an NHL coaching career, Sauer returned to Madison to replace him and immediately found the success that had eluded him at Colorado College when the Badgers won the national title in 1983. Throughout the 1980s Wisconsin remained one of the top programs in the country, routinely winning 20 games a year and in 1990 Sauer proved that not only could he coach a national champion, but he could build one as well when he captured his second NCAA title. In Sauer's 20 seasons with Wisconsin he provided 2 conference regular season titles, 5 conference tournament titles, 4 30-win seasons and 11 NCAA tournament berths in addition to winning two national titles. He retired as head coach after the 2001–02 season, turning the program over to Badger alumnus Mike Eaves. He retired as the winningest coach in Wisconsin history. He was inducted into the Wisconsin Badgers Hall of Fame in September 2016.

Administration
After stepping down Sauer agreed to serve as the assistant commissioner for the WCHA for several years and in 2010 he returned as head coach for the US sled hockey team at the 2010 Winter Paralympics. He helped the Americans to their second gold medal in the event and four years later returned for a repeat performance in Sochi. He died on February 2, 2017, from pancreatic cancer.

Head coaching record

† Wisconsin's participation in the 1992 Tournament was later vacated by the NCAA Committee on Infractions
References:

See also
List of college men's ice hockey coaches with 400 wins

References

External links

Wisconsin bio

1943 births
2017 deaths
Deaths from pancreatic cancer
American ice hockey coaches
Colorado College Tigers men's ice hockey coaches
Lester Patrick Trophy recipients
People from Fort Atkinson, Wisconsin
Wisconsin Badgers men's ice hockey coaches
Deaths from cancer in Wisconsin